The Hackensack River courses southward for approximately  through Rockland County in New York and Bergen and Hudson counties in northeastern New Jersey, forming the border of the latter two for part of its length.  Its source, as identified by the U.S. Geological Survey (Hydrological code 02030103901), is in New City, New York. The river empties into Newark Bay between Kearny Point (South Kearny) and Droyer's Point (Jersey City).

The area was settled by Bergen Dutch who established regular water crossings at Douwe's Ferry and Little Ferry. The first bridge crossing of the Hackensack was at Demarest Landing (now Old Bridge Road), built in 1724, which was replaced by that at New Bridge Landing in 1745. The first railroad crossing was completed by the NJRR in 1834, and was soon followed by many others. By the early 1900s conflicts between rail and maritime traffic led to calls for changes in regulations giving priority to trains.

At one time, Van Buskirk Island, created in 1804, was the head of navigation, but freshwater flow in the Hackensack has been diminished by construction of dams, namely the Oradell (1923), the DeForest (1952), and the Tappan (1972).  The river is now tidally influenced to the island.  The Hackensack has only been channelized to Milepoint 3.5 at the Riverbend in Hudson County.  The accumulation of silt has diminished the depth, and thus navigability, of the Lower Hackensack. which at one time was a major waterway for towboats and river barges in the Port of New York and New Jersey.

Since 1999, the bridge at Milepoint 16.3 is the most upstream bridge required by the Code of Federal Regulations to open on request, though no requests have made since 1994. The Lower Hackensack remains partially in use for commercial maritime traffic, notably for sewage sludge  for treatment at a facility on the bay. (Coal deliveries to the Hudson Generating Station ended upon the facilities closure). and Downstream of the power plant, vehicular moveable bridges (at MP 1.8 and MP 3.1) are required at all times to open on demand. and rail crossings to open on 1-hour notice. New crossings included the replacement the Wittpenn Bridge, a vehicular bridge at MP 3.1 with a new vertical lift bridge and replacement the Portal Bridge, a rail swing bridge at MP 5.0, with a through arch bridge.

Crossings

Abbreviations

CNJ=Central Railroad of New Jersey
CR=County Road, County Route
CSXT=CSX Transportation
DL&W=Delaware, Lackawanna and Western Railroad
Erie=Erie Railroad
H&M=Hudson and Manhattan Railroad
MNCR=Metro-North Railroad
MP=mile point
NYC=New York Central Railroad
NJDOT=New Jersey Department of Transportation
NJT=New Jersey Transit
NYS&W=New York, Susquehanna and Western Railway
NS=Norfolk Southern Railway
PATH=Port Authority Trans-Hudson
PRR=Pennsylvania Railroad
PS=Public Service Railway
USGS=United States Geological Survey

See also
 New Milford Plant of the Hackensack Water Company
 Overpeck Creek
 Hackensack RiverWalk
 Geography of New York–New Jersey Harbor Estuary
 Timeline of Jersey City, New Jersey-area railroads
 List of bridges, tunnels, and cuts in Hudson County, New Jersey
 List of crossings of the Lower Passaic River
 List of crossings of the Upper Passaic River
 List of NJ Transit moveable bridges
 List of fixed crossings of the North River (Hudson River)

References

Sources

External links

 Signals
 North Jersey.com: Bridges are man-made marvels of the Hackensack River
 

Transportation in Bergen County, New Jersey
Bridges in New Jersey

Hackensack River
Transportation in Hudson County, New Jersey
Transportation in Rockland County, New York
H
H
H
H